Mehrnoosh  (born November 1, 1976) is an Iranian Persian pop singer from Tehran. She currently lives in the state of Texas in the US after obtaining a Green Card through Diversity Visa Lottery. She is signed to the record label Avang Records, a California-based Iranian company.

She said in an interview with RadioJavan.com that most of her songs except videos, were done in Iran despite the many hardships she had to face as a woman. She mentioned Siavash Ghomeishi, a well-known Iranian pop songwriter and singer as her favorite. Prior to her musical work, she taught mathematics at the university level in Iran. She has a master's degree in statistics.

References

External links
 

1976 births
Living people
Iranian pop singers
People from Varamin
Iranian women singers
Persian-language singers
Iranian women pop singers
People from Tehran Province
21st-century Iranian women singers
Iranian emigrants to the United States
Iranian expatriates in the United States